is a Japanese footballer currently playing as a forward for Fukushima United, on loan from Montedio Yamagata.

Career
Belonged to Montedio Yamagata youth team from the first year of high school and served as captain in the third year. In June 2019, while studying at Komazawa University, it was decided to join Montedio Yamagata from the 2020 season, and at the same time he was approved as a JFA/J League special designated player.  He became the first youth graduate to sign a professional contract through college.

From 2020, Junya officially joined J2 club, Montedio Yamagata.

In 2021, Junya loaned to J3 club, Azul Claro Numazu from Montedio Yamagata for a season.

In 2022, Junya loaned again to J3 club, Fukushima United for a season.

Career statistics

Club
.

Notes

References

External links

1997 births
Living people
Sportspeople from Akita Prefecture
Association football people from Akita Prefecture
Komazawa University alumni
Japanese footballers
Association football forwards
J2 League players
J3 League players
Montedio Yamagata players
Azul Claro Numazu players